Real Genius is a 1985 American comic science fiction film directed by Martha Coolidge and written by Neal Israel, Pat Proft, and PJ Torokvei. Starring Val Kilmer and Gabriel Jarret, the film, set on the campus of Pacific Tech, a science and engineering university similar to Caltech, follows Chris Knight (Kilmer), a genius in his senior year, who is paired with a new student on campus, Mitch Taylor (Jarret), to work on a chemical laser.

The film received positive reviews from critics, and it grossed $12 million at the North American box office.

Plot
The CIA has covertly hired Professor Jerry Hathaway at Pacific Technical University to develop the power source for "Crossbow": a laser weapon precise enough to commit illegal political assassinations from outer space. Hathaway uses his position to recruit brilliant students to do the work for him but, aside from his graduate student and toady Kent, does not tell them the reason for their research.

Hathaway's latest prospect is genius high school student Mitch Taylor. Despite his youth and inexperience, Hathaway makes Mitch the lead on the project due to his innovative and original ideas in the field of laser physics. Mitch is roomed with Chris Knight, another member of the team, a legend in the "National Physics Club" and one of Mitch's idols. Mitch's ideal of Chris is shattered, however, when Chris turns out to be more of a goof-off than a hard-working student. Meanwhile, Hathaway hopes Mitch will encourage Chris to straighten up his act and that their two exceptional minds can develop a proper power source.

With the deadline quickly approaching, Mitch feels the pressure to complete the project while Chris continues in his carefree attitude. After inviting Mitch to a pool party to blow off steam, Kent reports this to Hathaway, who lambasts Mitch. Mitch breaks down and tearfully calls his parents, telling them he wants to go home.  Kent records the call without Mitch's knowledge and later plays the recording over the school's public address system, humiliating Mitch. As Mitch begins packing to leave, Chris explains about the pressures of school and burdens of being highly intelligent by relating the history of former Pacific Tech student Lazlo Hollyfeld. Lazlo cracked under the pressure and disappeared (actually now living in the university's tunnels beneath Chris and Mitch's closet).  Chris, fearing the same could happen to him, learned to lighten up and begin enjoying life. Mitch acquiesces to stay and they exact revenge on Kent by disassembling his car and reassembling it in his dorm room.

Hathaway, angry about the still-incomplete project and Chris's attitude, informs Chris that he intends to fail him in his final course needed for graduation and will give a coveted after-graduation job, originally promised to Chris, to Kent instead, as well as take steps to ensure Chris will never find work in the field of laser physics. Chris is disheartened and Mitch must use Chris's same argument to convince him to stay. The two commit themselves to finishing the 5 megawatt laser and making sure Chris passes Hathaway's final exam.

Kent sabotages their latest, nearly-successful apparatus. Though Chris knows Kent destroyed the laser, he can do nothing about it and is left to brood over the injustice; this inspires him to come up with a whole new system. The new solution works flawlessly, impressing Hathaway; he congratulates Chris and assures him that he will graduate. Chris and Mitch leave and celebrate, but Lazlo arrives to tell them his suspicions regarding the possible uses of such a laser. Realizing he is right, they return to the lab, but all the laser equipment has already been removed by Hathaway.

They surreptitiously implant a radio transmitter in Kent's mouth and use it convince him he is speaking to Jesus.  Kent divulges the location of the Air Force base where the equipment has been installed on a B-1 bomber. Chris and Mitch sneak onto the airbase and reprogram the coordinates of the target before going to Hathaway's home to set up a small prism. They gather outside Hathaway's home to watch as another school professor and a Congressman arrive, having been told of the test. Kent arrives and, though he was told by Jesus to remain outside, he goes inside. The laser test begins, with the new target being Hathaway's house. A very large bag of popcorn (Hathaway detests popcorn) is heated by the laser refracted by the prism, filling the house entirely and causing it to burst at the seams, with Kent riding a popcorn wave through the front door. Lazlo arrives in an RV—which he has won using mathematics in a blind sweepstakes contest—to tell them he is leaving. Later, Hathaway arrives to see what has become of his house.

Cast
 Val Kilmer as Chris Knight
 Gabriel Jarret as Mitch Taylor
 Michelle Meyrink as Jordan Cochran
 William Atherton as Professor Jerry Hathaway
 Robert Prescott as Kent
 Jon Gries as Lazlo Hollyfeld
 Mark Kamiyama as "Ick" Ikagami
 Ed Lauter as David Decker
 Louis Giambalvo as Major Don Carnagle
 Patti D'Arbanville as Sherry Nugil
 Severn Darden as Dr. Meredith
 Beau Billingslea as George
 Joanne Baron as Mrs. Taylor
 Sandy Martin as Mrs. Meredith
 Dean Devlin as Milton
 Yuji Okumoto as Fenton
 Deborah Foreman as Susan Decker
 Stacy Peralta as Shuttle Pilot

Production 
To prepare for Real Genius, Martha Coolidge spent months researching laser technology and the policies of the CIA, and interviewed dozens of students at Caltech. The screenplay was extensively rewritten, first by Lowell Ganz and Babaloo Mandel, later by Coolidge and PJ Torokvei.

Producer Brian Grazer remembers that when Val Kilmer came in to audition for the role of Chris Knight, he brought candy bars and performed tricks. Kilmer remembered it differently. "The character wasn't polite, so when I shook Grazer's hand and he said, 'Hi, I'm the producer,' I said, 'I'm sorry. You look like you're 12 years old. I like to work with men.'"

To achieve the house filled with popcorn for the film's climax, the production team popped popcorn continuously for three months. The popcorn was treated with fire retardant so it would not combust and covered so that it would not be eaten by birds and possibly poison them. The popcorn was then shipped to a subdivision under construction in Canyon Country, northwest of Los Angeles, and placed in the house.

To promote the film, the studio held what it billed as "the world's first computer press conference" with Coolidge and Grazer answering journalists' questions via computer terminals and relayed over the CompuServe computer network.

The dorm in the film is based on Dabney House at Caltech, and Caltech students served as consultants and played extras in the film.

Reception

Box office
Real Genius was released on August 9, 1985 in 990 theaters grossing $2.5 million in its first weekend. It went on to make $12,952,019 in North America.

Critical response
On review aggregator Rotten Tomatoes, the film holds an approval rating of 77% based on 35 reviews with an average rating of 6.7/10. The website's critical consensus reads, "It follows college tropes, but Real Genius has an optimistic streak that puts you on Val Kilmer's side all the way." On Metacritic, the film received a score of 71 based on 15 reviews, indicating "generally favorable reviews".

Colin Greenland reviewed the film for White Dwarf #85, and stated that it was "yet another celebration of the anxious wonder of growing up white, middle-class and heterosexual in America. The lovable weirdos squabble in the lab, play hi-tech pranks in the dorm and party in the lecture theatre. Nerds just wanna have fun. Nerds have feelings too. Hug a Nerd today."

In her review for The New York Times, Janet Maslin wrote, "the film is best when it takes [the students] seriously, though it does so only intermittently." David Ansen wrote in his review for Newsweek, "When it's good, the dormitory high jinks feel like the genuine release of teen-age tensions and cruelty. Too bad the story isn't as smart as the kids in it." In her review for the Washington Post, Rita Kempley wrote, "Many of the scenes, already badly written, fail to fulfill their screwball potential... [D]espite its enthusiastic young cast and its many good intentions, it doesn't quite succeed. I guess there's a leak in the think tank."

Chicago Sun Times film critic Roger Ebert awarded the film three and a half stars out of four, saying that it "contains many pleasures, but one of the best is its conviction that the American campus contains life as we know it." In his review for The Globe and Mail, Salem Alaton wrote, "Producer Brian Grazer craved a feel-good picture, and she [Martha Coolidge] turned in the summer's best, and she didn't cheat to do it. There's heart in the kookiness. Real Genius has real people, real comedy and real fun." Richard Schickel of Time praised the film for being "a smart, no-nonsense movie that may actually teach its prime audience a valuable lesson: the best retort to an intolerable situation is not necessarily a food fight. Better results, and more fun, come from rubbing a few brains briskly together."

Scientific accuracy
In the MythBusters episode "Car vs. Rain", first broadcast on June 17, 2009, the MythBusters team tried to determine whether the final scene in the film, the destruction of Dr. Hathaway's house with laser-popped popcorn, is actually possible. First they used a ten-watt laser to pop a single kernel wrapped in aluminum foil, showing that popping corn is possible with a laser. Then they tested a scaled-down model of a house. The popcorn was popped through induction heating because a sufficiently large laser was not available. The result was that the popcorn was unable to expand sufficiently to break glass, much less break open a door or move the house off its foundation. Instead, it ceased to expand and then simply charred.

It was also specifically stated in the program that a five-megawatt laser still did not exist, even in military applications, and that the most powerful military laser they knew of was 100 kilowatts.

In January 2011, it was further demonstrated on video in a home setting that a kernel of corn directly exposed to laser light from accessible consumer level lasers could be popped as reported by TechCrunch.

The solid xenon-halogen laser proposed and built by Chris in the latter half of the film, though in the realm of science fiction, was based on a theory of the time. Real Genius, through consultant Martin A. Gundersen (who played the math professor), was later cited in an academic publication that detailed the scientific basis behind the laser.

Television series
Reports surfaced in September 2014 that a potential television series was in the works. NBC was set to produce the comedy series with Sony TV, Happy Madison and 3 Arts Entertainment.   there are no updates on the production.

References

External links

 
 
 
 

1985 films
1980s science fiction comedy films
1980s teen comedy films
American science fiction comedy films
American teen comedy films
1980s English-language films
American films about revenge
Films about pranks
Films directed by Martha Coolidge
Films produced by Brian Grazer
Films scored by Thomas Newman
Films set in Los Angeles
Films set in universities and colleges
Films shot in Los Angeles
TriStar Pictures films
Films with screenplays by Pat Proft
Films with screenplays by Neal Israel
Films with screenplays by PJ Torokvei
1985 comedy films
California Institute of Technology in fiction
1980s American films